Angle Lifeboat Station, Angle, Pembrokeshire, Wales, first opened in 1868 after a request from the local Coastguard for a lifeboat station to be opened within the Milford Haven Waterway. Originally called Milford Lifeboat Station, in 1892 the name was officially changed by the Royal National Lifeboat Institution (RNLI) committee.

The station currently operates a  lifeboat Mark Mason and a  lifeboat SuperG II.

History
The station was established by the RNLI in 1868, although three RNLI silver medals had already been awarded for local rescues. A boat house and wooden slipway were built, the latter replaced by a stronger slipway in 1888. A new boathouse and roller slipway were built in 1927 and two years later the station took delivery of its first motor-lifeboat.

In 1991 construction began of a new, larger, boathouse and slipway adjacent to the 1927 structure. Following completion in 1992, the old boathouse and slipway were demolished.

In the 1990s an inshore lifeboat station was established and in 1996 a D-class lifeboat, D-493 Isabella Mary began service at the station. The 1992 all-weather lifeboat station was adapted for the new, larger, Tamar class lifeboat, and in 2009 the station took delivery of the Tamar-class, 16-11 Mark Mason.

Station honours

Twelve RNLI Medals have been awarded, seven silver and five bronze, including two second award clasps, and three medals before the station was established in 1868. 

The first rescue where the crew received medals was in 1894, with 27 (some say 33) people saved from the 1878-built Loch Shiel which had run onto rocks off Thorn Island. Two lifeboat crew members and the honorary secretary received RNLI silver medals. One of these crew members was Thomas Rees, who is buried in the churchyard at St Mary's. It was said that the lifeboat was unable to reach the stricken ship, but the lifeboat crew managed to get to it by climbing around Thorn Island and getting a rope to the ship.

The rescue is described as Wales' "Whisky Galore". The Loch Shiel was carrying goods from Scotland to Adelaide and included gunpowder, beer, and 7,500 (some say 7,000) cases of Glasgow whisky. The cargo was partially recovered by the Customs, but some of the bottles are still amongst the wreck and are described as "undrinkable". In 1999, bottles of beer from the wreck were auctioned for £1,000 per bottle.

The next award was a bronze medal awarded to Coxswain James Watkins for rescuing 28 people on 26 November 1929 from the single-screw steamship Molesley which had been caught by a sudden wind change and a poor decision by its captain. James Watkins went on to be awarded a silver medal for rescuing 6 people in 1944 from the motor boat Thor, and a year later another bronze medal for a difficult rescue of nine people from the steamer . (This steamer had been seized from the Germans and sank on 15 July before it could be renamed the Empire Concourse.) James Watkins finally retired in 1946 after 24 years service as coxswain and 13 years as second coxswain. 

More recently, Coxswain William John Rees Holmes has been awarded two bronze medals. The first was in 1977 when the tanker Donna Marike was thought to be about to explode and the lifeboat stood by her in December 1976. The second bronze medal was for rescuing three people from the fishing boat Cairnsmore on 1 December 1978.

In 1997 a third coxswain, Jeremy R. Rees, and his crew were awarded another bronze medal for rescuing four people after their motor boat, Dale Princess, was blown on to cliffs on Skomer Island. The rescue was made in gale force winds and stormy seas.

Fleet

All Weather boats

Pulling and Sailing Lifeboats

Steam lifeboat

Motor Lifeboats

Inshore Lifeboats

See also
 Royal National Lifeboat Institution
 List of RNLI stations

References

External links
 The official website of Angle Lifeboat
 The station page on the RNLI Angle Lifeboat website

Lifeboat stations in Wales
Transport infrastructure completed in 1868